Ashgabat International Airport , formerly known as Saparmyrat Türkmenbaşy International Airport, is one of five international airports in Turkmenistan. It is located within the city limits of Ashgabat (Ashkhabad). The old airport, with its air traffic control tower and a  precision approach runway (12L-30R), opened in 1994 and was named after the country's first president, Saparmyrat Niyazov. The new airport terminal opened in September 2016, after being completely redesigned and rebuilt and after the south runway was moved and lengthened to parallel the north runway.

History

Soviet 
Turkmen civil aviation began in 1927, the year air communications began between Chardzhou and Tashauz, flying through the settlements of Turtkul and Novo-Urgench (both in the Uzbek SSR). For this route, four-passenger Junkers F.13 aircraft were purchased in Germany, as well as Soviet four-passenger Kalinin K-4 aircraft. Eight aircraft served this airline. Later, in 1932, newer Soviet aircraft were purchased for the transport of passengers. The Kalinin K-5 aircraft seated six, and the Tupolev ANT-9 aircraft had twelve seats. With this replenishment of the Turkmen SSR air fleet, in 1932 an air division was formed at Chardzhou Airport that directly served the Chardzhou-Tashauz route, without stops in other settlements. In Soviet times, the airport was used exclusively for servicing flights within the USSR. Currently, in addition to the aircraft of the local airline fleet, the airport serves the planes of several foreign airlines of the world, performing both passenger and cargo flights.

Independent Turkmenistan 
The first modern airport terminal opened in 1994 with a capacity of 1,600 passengers per hour. In Soviet times, the airport was used exclusively for domestic flights.

As part of Saparmurat Niyazov's aspiration to transform Turkmenistan into 'the new Kuwait', he sought to construct a distinctive airport. This zeal resulted in the control tower being constructed on the wrong side of the runway. The 'gaudy new terminal' now blocked the view of air traffic controllers as they guided pilots. The builders warned him of this, however, he responded that, "It looks better this way."

The building was dismantled in 2013.

New building (2016) 
The Turkmen government let an international tender in 2012 for reconstruction of the airport in Ashgabat, to be named "Oguz Han". Polimeks, a Turkish construction company active in Turkmenistan since the late-1990s, was declared winner of the tender. The new airport was opened on 17 September 2016 by President Gurbanguly Berdimuhamedow. The project cost $2.3 billion (€1.7 billion) and features a highly unusual terminal design in the shape of a falcon. The new airport has capacity to serve 14 million passengers per year at a rate of 1,600 passengers per hour. The airport covers 350,000 m2 and includes a passenger terminal, VIP terminal, cargo terminal with capacity to handle 200,000 tonnes of freight per year, a new air traffic control tower (ATCT), a maintenance hangar for three narrow-body aircraft, new fueling stations, catering, fire brigade, flight simulation, repair and maintenance buildings, parking space for 3,000 cars, a civil aviation school as well as a medical center. The airport has also a second 3,800-meter long runway to serve wide-body, double-deck jet airliners such as the Airbus A380 and Boeing 747-8.

Facilities
There are two artificial runways, equipped with the second category ILS and platform, enabling them to take aircraft of all types. All services of the airport work around the clock. The airport includes passenger waiting rooms, immigration, customs, border control, a 24-hour reference service, VIP and CIP rooms, a business club, a ticket office for (Turkmenistan Airlines), shops, bars, fast-food outlets, currency exchange, a new baggage handling conveyor system, international telephone, a mother and child room and the offices for (Star Alliance air carriers and Turkish Airlines).

On 26 March 2014, a small passenger terminal was opened during a ceremony attended by President Gurbanguly Berdimuhamedow. The terminal is located on the site of a pre-existing Turkmen SSR airport (behind the bus station) on 2013 Street (Cosmonaut Boulevard). For the period of construction of the main passenger terminal the temporary terminal served passengers departing from and arriving to Ashgabat. After commissioning of the main terminal, the terminal was used for domestic routes and charter flights.

Airlines and destinations

Ground transportation
The airport is located near M37 highway and connect to them as a four-lane motorway. Terminal parking, short-term and long-term parking is available at the airport.

Bus 
There is regular bus service by bus line 1, 18, 22, 58 from the airport to Ashgabat city. Complete list of local services is available at the Ashgabat passenger motor transport enterprise website.

Taxi 
There are Awtomobil Ulag Hyzmaty company offering services at Ashgabat Airport.

See also
List of the busiest airports in the former USSR
List of airports in Turkmenistan
Transportation in Turkmenistan

References

External links

Airports in Turkmenistan
Airport
Transport in Ashgabat
Airports established in 1994
1994 establishments in Turkmenistan